Wang Tso-jung (6 February 1919 – 30 July 2013) was a Taiwanese politician who served as President of the Control Yuan from 1996 to 1999.

He earned a master's degree in economics from the University of Washington in the United States and taught at National Taiwan University.

Wang was awarded the Order of Propitious Clouds in June 2013. He died of sepsis on 30 July 2013 at Taipei Veterans General Hospital, where he had undergone treatment for pneumonia. His eldest son Wang Nien-tsu became an engineer and entrepreneur.

Works
 財經文存三編, China Times Publishing Co., 1989

References

1919 births
2013 deaths
Deaths from sepsis
Republic of China politicians from Hubei
Taiwanese Presidents of the Control Yuan
Taiwanese people from Hubei
Academic staff of the National Taiwan University
University of Washington alumni